Tall Chegah-e Olya (also Romanized as Tall Chegāh-e ‘Olyā; also known as Tal Chegāh, Tal Chekā-ye Bālā, Tol Chegāh, and Tol Chegāh-e Bālā) is a village in Sardasht Rural District, Zeydun District, Behbahan County, Khuzestan Province, Iran. At the 2006 census, its population was 308, in 66 families.

References 

Populated places in Behbahan County